Çiriş  is a village in Erdemli district of Mersin Province, Turkey. It is  situated to the south of dense forestry of the Taurus Mountains. The population of Çiriş was 910 as of 2012. The village was founded in a place full of ancient ruins. It was named after the Turkish name of the plant Asphodelus. The main economic activity of the village is farming. Various vegetables and fruits (including greenhouse crops) are produced. Tropical fruits like avocado and kiwifruit are also produced.

References

Villages in Erdemli District